The following is a List of current AFL Women's team squads for the 2022 AFL Women's season.

Adelaide Football Club

Brisbane Lions

Carlton Football Club

Collingwood Football Club

Essendon Football Club

Fremantle Football Club

Geelong Football Club

Gold Coast Football Club

Greater Western Sydney Giants

Hawthorn Football Club

Melbourne Football Club

North Melbourne Football Club

Port Adelaide Football Club

Richmond Football Club

St Kilda Football Club

Sydney Swans

West Coast Eagles

Western Bulldogs

See also

 List of current AFL team squads
 List of current NRL Women's team squads

Squads, current
AFL Women's